A list of alumni of Christ Church, Oxford, one of the constituent colleges of the University of Oxford in England. Its alumni include politicians, lawyers, bishops, poets, and academics.

At least thirteen British prime ministers have been educated at Christ Church, including Sir Robert Peel (Prime Minister 1834–1835 & 1841–1846), Anthony Eden (1955–1957) and William Ewart Gladstone (1892–94, 1886, 1880–85, & 1868–74). At least ten Chancellors of the Exchequer have also been educated at Christ Church including Nigel Lawson (1983–1989) and William Murray (Lord Chief Justice 1756–1788 and Chancellor of the Exchequer 1757) as well as other prominent UK politicians such as Quintin McGarel Hogg (Lord Chancellor 1979–1987). Christ Church has also educated many people who have gone on to take prominent political roles abroad, such as Zulfikar Ali Bhutto (former Prime minister of Pakistan), Bilawal Bhutto Zardari (Chairman of the Pakistan Peoples Party), S.W.R.D. Bandaranaike (Prime Minister of Ceylon (later Sri Lanka)) and Charles Cotesworth Pinckney.

A number of members of royal families were educated at Christ Church including King Edward VII (1841–1910), King of the United Kingdom and Emperor of India and his brother Prince Leopold, Duke of Albany as well as King William II of the Netherlands, Prince Abbas Hilmi from the Egyptian royal family, and Prince Hassan bin Talal from the Jordanian royal family.

There are numerous former students in the fields of academia and theology including seventeen Archbishops, most recently Rowan Williams (Archbishop of Canterbury 2002–2012). Other students in these areas include George Kitchin (the first chancellor of the University of Durham and Dean of Durham Cathedral), John Charles Ryle (first Bishop of Liverpool), John Wesley (leader of the Methodist movement), Richard William Jelf (Principal of King's College London), Ronald Montagu Burrows (Principal of King's College London) and Bishop William Stubbs (Bishop of Oxford and historian). Prominent philosophers including John Locke, John Rawls, Sir A. J. Ayer and Daniel Dennett also studied at Christ Church.

Albert Einstein was elected to undertake a 5-year Research Studentship in 1931, philosopher and polymath Robert Hooke and developmental biologist Sir John B. Gurdon (co-winner of the 2012 Nobel Prize in Physiology or Medicine), physician Sir Archibald Edward Garrod, the Father of Modern Medicine Sir William Osler, biochemist Kenneth Callow, radio astronomer Sir Martin Ryle and epidemiologist Sir Richard Doll are all associated with the college.

A number of successful businessmen have also been educated at Christ Church including Alex Beard (Glencore), Sir Michael Moritz (Sequoia Capital), Crispin Odey (hedge fund manager), Jacob Rothschild (N M Rothschild & Sons), Nicky Oppenheimer (De Beers), Peter Moores (Littlewoods), James A. Reed (Reed group), and Cameron and Tyler Winklevoss (twins associated with the founding of Facebook).

The college has educated six Olympic gold medalists including Jonny Searle in rowing. Other notable alumni include entrepreneur and founder of Pennsylvania William Penn, broadcaster David Dimbleby, composer Sir William Walton and the writers Lewis Carroll and W. H. Auden.

The college accepted men only for over four centuries, until 1980, which explains the dearth of women on this list of notable alumni.

The following list is not comprehensive and a fuller list can be found in the :Category: Alumni of Christ Church, Oxford.

UK and foreign royalty

 Edward VII (1841–1910), King of the United Kingdom and Emperor of India
 Prince Leopold, Duke of Albany (1853–84), youngest son of Queen Victoria and brother of King Edward VII
 King William II (1792–1849), King of the Netherlands
 Prince Abbas Hilmi (1941–), Egyptian prince and financial manager
 Prince Hassan bin Talal (1947–), son of King Talal
 Princess Badiya bint Hassan (1974–), Daughter of Prince Hassan bin Talal
Prince Paul of Yugoslavia  (1893-1976) Prince Regent of Yugoslavia

British Prime Ministers

 Anthony Eden, 1st Earl of Avon (1897–1977)
 Archibald Primrose, 5th Earl of Rosebery (1847–1929)
 Edward Smith-Stanley, 14th Earl of Derby (1799–1869)
 George Canning (1770–1827)
 George Grenville (1712–1770)
 Robert Gascoyne-Cecil, 3rd Marquess of Salisbury (1830–1903)
 Robert Jenkinson, 2nd Earl of Liverpool (1770–1828)
 Sir Alec Douglas-Home, Baron Home of the Hirsel (1903–1995)
 Sir Robert Peel (1788–1850)
 William Cavendish-Bentinck, 3rd Duke of Portland (1738–1809)
 William Ewart Gladstone (1809–1898)
 William Petty, 2nd Earl of Shelburne (1737–1805)
 William Wyndham Grenville, 1st Baron Grenville (1759–1834)
 William Pulteney, 1st Earl of Bath (1684–1764) (For two days)

Politicians and civil servants

UK Cabinet Members
 Francis Baring, 1st Baron Northbrook (1796–1866), Chancellor of the Exchequer
 John Carteret, 2nd Earl Granville (1690–1763), diplomat and statesman
 Sir George Cornewall Lewis (1806–1863), writer, Foreign Secretary and Home Secretary
 William Dowdeswell (1721–1775), Chancellor of the Exchequer
 Francis Godolphin Osborne, 5th Duke of Leeds (1759–1799), politician and Foreign Secretary
 Derick Heathcoat-Amory, 1st Viscount Amory (1899–1981), Chancellor of the Exchequer and Chancellor of the University of Exeter
 Michael Hicks-Beach, 1st Earl St Aldwyn (1837–1916), Chancellor of the Exchequer
 Quintin McGarel Hogg, Baron Hailsham of St Marylebone (1907–2001), Lord Chancellor
 Nigel Lawson, Baron Lawson (1932–), Chancellor of the Exchequer (1983-1989), Member of Parliament for Blaby (1974-1992), Member of the House of Lords (1992-)
 Granville George Leveson-Gower, 2nd Earl Granville (1815–1891), politician and Foreign Secretary
 Frederick Alexander Lindemann, 1st Viscount Cherwell (1886–1957), physicist and cabinet minister
 George Lyttelton, 1st Baron Lyttelton (1709–1773), Chancellor of the Exchequer
 William Murray, 1st Earl of Mansfield (1705–1793), Lord Chief Justice and Chancellor of the Exchequer
 George Nugent-Temple-Grenville, 1st Marquess of Buckingham (1753–1813), Foreign Secretary and statesman
 George Ward Hunt (1825–1877), Chancellor of the Exchequer
 John Wodehouse, 1st Earl of Kimberley (1826–1902), politician and foreign secretary
 Sir George Young, 6th Baronet(1941–), Leader of the House of Commons (2010-2012), Government Chief Whip (2012–14)
 Nicholas Vansittart, 1st Baron Bexley (1766–1851), Chancellor of the Exchequer
 Sir William Wyndham, 3rd Baronet (1688–1740), Chancellor of the Exchequer

Current UK MPs
 Felicity Buchan (1970–), Member of Parliament for Kensington since 2019
 Alex Burghart (1978–), Member of Parliament for Brentwood and Ongar since 2017
 Richard Graham (1958–), Member of Parliament for Gloucester since 2010
 James Gray (1954–), Member of Parliament for North Wiltshire since 1997
 Nigel Huddleston (1970–), Member of Parliament for Mid Worcestershire since 2015
 Neil O'Brien (1978–), Member of Parliament for Harborough since 2017
 Chris Skidmore (1981–), Member of Parliament for Kingswood since 2010
 Jamie Wallis (1984–), Member of Parliament for Bridgend since 2019

Former UK MPs
 Charles Abbot, 1st Baron Colchester (1757–1829), Speaker of the House of Commons
 Jonathan Aitken (1942–), Member of Parliament for Thanet East (1977-1983) and Thanet South (1983-1997)
 Michael Ancram (1945–), Chairman and Deputy Leader of the Conservative Party 
 Anthony Ashley Cooper, 7th Earl of Shaftesbury (1801–1885), politician and philanthropist
 Tom Driberg, Baron Bradwell (1905–1976), politician and writer
 Edward Boyle, Baron Boyle of Handsworth (1923–1981), MP and Vice-Chancellor of the University of Leeds
 Randolph Churchill (1911–1968), Member of Parliament for Preston (1940-1945) and son of Sir Winston Churchill
 Alan Clark (1928–1999), politician and diarist
 Edward Eliot, 3rd Earl of St Germans (1798–1877), politician
 Robert Gascoyne-Cecil, 7th Marquess of Salisbury (1946–), Conservative politician
 William Henry Gladstone (1840–1891), MP and son of William Ewart Gladstone
 Richard Grosvenor, 2nd Marquess of Westminster (1795–1869), MP Privy Council
 Nicholas Walter Lyell, Baron Lyell of Markyate (1938–2010), Attorney General
 Sir William Miles, 1st Baronet (1797–1878), politician
 Louise Mensch (1971–), Member of Parliament for Corby (2010-2012)
 Henry William Paget, 1st Marquess of Anglesey (1768–1854), soldier and politician
 Mark Reckless (1970–), Member of Parliament for Rochester and Strood (2010–15)
 George Spencer-Churchill, 6th Duke of Marlborough MP and great-grandfather of Sir Winston Churchill
 Charles Vane-Tempest-Stewart, 6th Marquess of Londonderry (1852–1915), Conservative politician, Lord President of the Council
 William Vane, 2nd Viscount Vane (c. 1706 – 1734), Member of Parliament
 Arthur Wellesley, 2nd Duke of Wellington (1807–1884), Son of Arthur Wellesley, 1st Duke of Wellington, victor of Waterloo
 David Willetts (1956–), Member of Parliament for Havant (1992-2015), Member of the House of Lords (2015-)
 William Wingfield (1772–1858), MP, Chief Justice of the Brecon Circuit

Members of the House of Lords
 Frederick Curzon, 7th Earl Howe (1951–), Hereditary Peer
 David Douglas-Home, 15th Earl of Home (1943–) Hereditary Peer and son of Alec Douglas-Home
 William Fox-Strangways, 4th Earl of Ilchester (1795–1865), politician, Art Collector
 Charles Gordon-Lennox, 6th Duke of Richmond (1818–1903), Leader of the House of Lords, Lord President of the Council
 John Palmer, 4th Earl of Selborne (1940–), Hereditary Peer
 Henry Richard Vassall-Fox, 3rd Baron Holland (1773–1840), Whig politician and minister

Members of the European Parliament
 Charles Wellesley, 9th Duke of Wellington (1949–), Conservative MEP
 William Legge, 10th Earl of Dartmouth (1949-), UK Independence Party MEP

Foreign politicians
 Solomon Bandaranaike (1899–1959), Prime Minister of Ceylon from 1956 to 1959
 Zulfikar Ali Bhutto (1928–1979), Pakistani statesman, Founder chairman Pakistan Peoples Party
 Murtaza Bhutto (1954–1996), Politician and former chairman of Pakistan Peoples Party of Shaheed Bhutto
 Bilawal Bhutto Zardari (1988–), Chairman of the Pakistan Peoples Party
 Charles Cotesworth Pinckney (1746–1825), early American statesman, diplomat and presidential candidate
 Mark Filip (1966–), Attorney General of the United States
 Edward (Ted) Bigelow Jolliffe (1909–1998), Leader of the Opposition in the Legislative Assembly of Ontario
 Edward Pakenham, 6th Earl of Longford (1902–1961)
 Thomas Pinckney (1750–1828), early American statesman and diplomat

Civil servants and diplomats
 Sir Antony Acland (1930–), Head of the Diplomatic Service
 Robert Armstrong, Baron Armstrong of Ilminster (1927–2020), Head of the Civil Service
 Henry Bennet, 1st Earl of Arlington (1618–1685), diplomat and statesman
 Ian Blair (1953–), Commissioner of Police of the Metropolis
 Sir Charles Brickdale (1857–1944), Chief Registrar of HM Land Registry
 Richard Burn (1871–1947), Indologist and civil servant in India
 David Durie, Sir (1944–) Governor of Gibraltar from 2000 to 2003
 Richard Lyons, 1st Viscount Lyons (1817–1877), diplomat
 Cecil Harmsworth King (1901–1987), director at the Bank of England
 Maharaja Gaj Singh II (1948–), erstwhile ruler of Marwar-Jodhpur, India, former Member of Parliament and Indian High Commissioner to Trinidad & Tobago
 Maharaja Meghrajji III of Dhrangadhra-Halvad (1923–2010), Uprajprajpramukh (and sometime Acting Rajpramukh) of Saurashtra, anthropologist
 Roger Mellor Makins, 1st Baron Sherfield (1904–1996), diplomat
 Sir Crispin Tickell (1930–), Permanent Representative of the United Kingdom to the United Nations
 Sir Brian Urquhart (1919–2021), Under-Secretary-General of the United Nations

Members of the UK Supreme Court
 David Neuberger, Baron Neuberger of Abbotsbury (1948–), President of the Supreme Court of the United Kingdom

Viceroys and Governors General
 Charles John Canning, 1st Earl Canning (1812–1862), politician and Governor-General of India
 Edward Wood, 1st Earl of Halifax (1881–1959), Foreign Secretary and Viceroy of India
 Frederick Hamilton-Temple-Blackwood, 1st Marquess of Dufferin and Ava (1826–1902), Governor-General of Canada and Viceroy of India
 George Eden, 1st Earl of Auckland (1784–1849), politician and Governor-General of India
 Gilbert Elliot-Murray-Kynynmound, 1st Earl of Minto (1751–1814), politician and Governor-General of India
 James Andrew Broun-Ramsay, 1st Marquess of Dalhousie (1812–1860), politician and Governor-General of India
 James Bruce, 8th Earl of Elgin (1811–1863), Governor-General of Canada and Viceroy of India
 General John Guise (1682/3–1765), Amy Officer, Art Collector
 Lord William Bentinck (1774–1839), soldier and Governor-General of India
 Miles Fitzalan-Howard, 17th Duke of Norfolk (1915–2002) Major General
 Richard Wellesley, 1st Marquess Wellesley (1760–1842), Foreign Secretary and Governor-General of India
 Richard Temple-Nugent-Brydges-Chandos-Grenville, 3rd Duke of Buckingham and Chandos (1823–1889), Governor of Madras
 Rudolph Lambart, 10th Earl of Cavan (1865–1946), Chief of the Imperial General Staff.
 Thomas George Baring, 1st Earl of Northbrook (1826–1904), Viceroy of India and First Lord of the Admiralty
 William Pitt Amherst, 1st Earl Amherst (1773–1857), Governor-General of India
 William Lygon, 7th Earl Beauchamp (1872–1938), Governor of New South Wales

Philosophers

 Sir Alfred Ayer (1910–1989), philosopher
 John Lane Bell (1945– ), logician
 Daniel Dennett (1942– ), philosopher
 Sir Michael Dummett (1925–2011), philosopher
 John Locke (1632–1704), philosopher
 Gilbert Ryle (1900–1976), philosopher
 John Rawls (1921–2002), philosopher
 John Searle (1932– ), philosopher
 John Theophilus Desaguliers (1683–1744), philosopher

Theologians

 John Morris (1595-1648), Regius Professor of Hebrew at Oxford
 Adam Blakeman (1596–1665), preacher and American settler
 Bernard Gilpin (1517–1583), 'Apostle of the North'
 Charles Wesley (1707–1788), Methodist preacher and hymnist
 Edward Bouverie Pusey (1800–1882), churchman and progenitor of the Oxford Movement
 Eric Lionel Mascall (1905–1993), Anglo-Catholic theologian
 George William Kitchin (1827–1912), theologian and Dean of Durham Cathedral
 John Charles Ryle (1816–1900), evangelical Anglican leader and first Bishop of Liverpool
 John Fell (bishop) (1625–1686), Dean of Christ Church and Bishop of Oxford
 Samuel Fell (1584–1649) Dean of Christ Church, Oxford and Vice-Chancellor of the University of Oxford
 John Macquarrie (1919–2007), Christian Existentialist
 John Wesley (1703–1791), leader of the Methodist movement
 Percy Dearmer (1867–1936), priest and liturgist
 Peter Martyr Vermigli (1499–1562), theologian
 Rowan Williams (1950–), Archbishop of Canterbury
 Charles Longley (1794–1868), Archbishop of Canterbury
 William Wake (1657–1737), Archbishop of Canterbury
 John Potter (1674–1747), Archbishop of Canterbury
 John Moore (1730–1805), Archbishop of Canterbury
 William Howley (1766–1848), Archbishop of Canterbury
 Trevor Huddleston (1913–1998), Archbishop of Mauritius and anti-Apartheid campaigner
 Lancelot Blackburne 1658–1743), Archbishop of York
 Tobias Matthew (1546–1628), Archbishop of York
 Edward Venables-Vernon-Harcourt (1757–1847), Archbishop of York
 William Markham (bishop) (1719–1807), Archbishop of York
 Robert Hay Drummond (1711–1776), Archbishop of York
 John Gilbert (1693–1761), Archbishop of York
 John Dolben (1625–1686), Archbishop of York
 Tobias Matthew (1546–1628), Archbishop of York, Dean of Christ Church, Vice-Chancellor of Oxford University
 John Piers (1522/3 – 1594), Archbishop of York
 Michael Cox (1689–1779), Archbishop of Cashel
 Edward King (1829–1910), high church Bishop of Lincoln

Academics
 A. L. Rowse (1903–1997), historian
 Anthony Chenevix-Trench (1919–1979), classicist and headmaster of Bradfield College, Eton College and Fettes College
 Edward de Bono (1933–)
 Hugh Trevor-Roper, Baron Dacre (1914–2003), historian
 Homi K. Bhabha (1949–), Anne F. Rothenberg Professor of English and American Literature and Language
 Jan Morris (1926–2020), writer and historian
 Prince Dmitriy Obolensky (1918–2001), historian
 Norman Cohn (1915–2007), historian
 Richard Carew (1555–1620), translator and antiquary
 Charles Dennis Fisher (1877–1916), classical scholar
 SR Gardiner (1829–1902), historian 
 Richard William Jelf (1798–1871), Principal of King's College London (1843–1868)
 Robert Blake, Baron Blake (1916–2003), historian
 Robert Burchfield (1923–2004) scholar, writer, and lexicographer
 Ronald Montagu Burrows (1867–1920), Principal of King's College London (1913–1920)
 Sir Hugh Lloyd-Jones (1922–2009), classical scholar
 Sir Michael Howard (1922–2019), historian
 Sir Raymond Carr (1919–), historian
 Sir Roy Harrod (1900–1978), economist
 Sir William Deakin (1913–2005), historian and diplomat
 Spencer Barrett (1914–2001), classical scholar
 Shahid Javed Burki (1938–), Vice-President of the World Bank
 William Camden (1551–1623), antiquarian and historian
 Sir Halford Mackinder, (1861–1947), geographer and educationalist
 Richard Newton, (1676–1753), founder and principal of the first Hertford College, Oxford in 1740
 Laurence Nowell (c.1515-c.1571), antiquary and cartographer 
 Bishop William Stubbs (1825–1901), distinguished constitutional historian and ecclesiastic
 Robert William Eyton (1815–1881), antiquarian of Shropshire
 Mark Girouard (1931-), architectural historian

Mathematicians and scientists

 Albert Einstein (elected to a 5-year Research Studentship in 1931)
 Clare Grey, chemist, University of Cambridge professor
 John Freind (1675–1728), physician and chemist
 John Kidd (1775–1851), physician, chemist and geologist
 Robert Hooke (1635–1703), scientist and inventor
 Sir Ray Lankester (1847–1929), invertebrate zoologist and evolutionary biologist, Copley Medal award winner
 Sir Archibald Garrod (1857–1936), physician and pioneer molecular geneticist
 Sir Denys Wilkinson (1922–2016), nuclear physicist
 Edmund Gunter (1581–1626), mathematician
 Sir Francis Simon (1893–1956), physicist
 Kenneth Callow (1901–1983), biochemist
 Sir John Maddox (1925–2009), science writer
 Sir Joseph Banks (1743–1820), botanist
 Sir Martin Ryle (1918–1984, radio astronomer
 Sir Martin Wood (1927–), engineer
 Patrick David Wall (1925–2001), Neuroscientist
 Sir Richard Doll (1912–2005), epidemiologist
 Richard Lower (physician) (1631–1691), first to perform blood transfusion
 Thomas Willis (1621–1675), physician and neurologist
 William Buckland (1784–1856), geologist, palaeontologist and omnivore
 Sir William Osler (1849–1919), physician, Father of Modern Medicine, and Regius Chair of Medicine (Oxford, 1905–1919)
 John D. Barrow (1977–1980), cosmologist, Templeton Laureate, RAS Gold medallist
 John B. Gurdon (1933–), developmental biologist, co-winner of the 2012 Nobel Prize in Physiology or Medicine
 Ted Cooke-Yarborough (1918–2013), computer and radar pioneer
 Mark Williamson, biologist
 Sir Wallace Akers (1888–1954), Chemist

Sports people

 Harold Barker, Silver in the Coxless Four – 1908 GB
 Robin Bourne-Taylor, Eight – 2004, Pair  – 2008 GB
 Peter Cazalet (1907–73), English cricketer, jockey, racehorse owner and trainer
 John Pius Boland (1870–1958), MP and winner of gold medal for tennis in the 1896 Olympics
 Lewis Clive, Gold in the Coxless Pair – 1932 GB, killed in action in the Spanish Civil War
 Hugh R A (Jumbo) Edwards, Gold in the Coxless Pair – 1932, Gold in the Coxless Four – 1932 GB
 Albert Gladstone, Gold in the Eight – 1908 GB
 Charles Grimes (rower), Gold in the Eight – 1956 USA
 Ante Kušurin, Double Sculls – 2008 Croatia
 Max Mosley, President of FIA 1993–2009
 David Sawyier, Coxed Four – 1972 USA
 Jamie Schroeder, Quadruple Sculls – 2008 USA
 Jonny Searle (1969–), Gold in the Coxed pair – 1992 Summer Olympics, Bronze in the Coxed Four – 1996 Summer Olympics
 Cameron and Tyler Winklevoss, Coxless Pair – 2008 Summer Olympics USA, see also business

Artists and writers

 Sir Harold Acton (1904–1994) writer and scholar
 W. H. Auden (1907–1973), poet
 F. W. Bain (1863–1940), writer of fantasy stories
 Daubridgecourt Belchier(1580–1621), dramatist
 Kate Brooke, screenwriter
 Robert Burton (1577–1640), writer of 'The Anatomy of Melancholy'
 David Carritt (1927–1982), British art historian, dealer and critic
 Lewis Carroll (1832–1898), (real name, Charles Lutwidge Dodgson), writer, clergyman and mathematician
 Apsley Cherry-Garrard (1886–1959), Antarctic explorer and writer
 Richard Curtis (1956–), comedy writer
 Sir Robert Dudley (1574–1649), explorer and cartographer
 Geoffrey Faber (1889–1961), publisher
 Peter Fleming (1907–1971), traveller and writer
 Charles Greville (1794–1865), diarist and cricketer
 Bryan Guinness 2nd Lord Moyne (1905–1992), poet and brewer
 Desmond Guinness (1931–), conservationist and author
 Sheridan Hamilton-Temple-Blackwood, 5th Marquess of Dufferin and Ava (1938–1988), art patron
 Richard Hakluyt (1552–1616), writer
 Francis Hastings, 16th Earl of Huntingdon (1901–1990), artist
 Henry Hitchings (1974–), author and critic
 Barney Hoskyns (1959–) acclaimed music journalist
 Lennie Lee (1958–), artist
 Matthew Gregory Lewis (1775–1818), novelist and dramatist
 Sir John Masterman (1891–1977), academic, sportsman, author and spymaster
 Adrian Mitchell (1932–2008), poet, novelist and playwright
Lewis Charles Powles (1860-1942), artist
 Clere Parsons (1908–1931), poet
 Bishop Thomas Percy (1729–1811), balladeer and early romantic poet
 Frank Prewett, (1893–1962), poet
 Adrian Mitchell (1932–2008), poet, novelist and playwright
 John Crowe Ransom (1888–1974), American poet, critic and academic
 John Ruskin (1819–1900), critic, poet and artist
Anthony Sampson (1926–2004), writer
 Sir Philip Sidney (1554–1586), poet and soldier
 Philip Stanhope, 5th Earl Stanhope(1805–1875), founder of the National Portrait Gallery
J. I. M. Stewart (Michael Innes) (1906–1994), literary critic and novelist
 Christopher Sykes (1907–1986), author
 James Twining (1972–), novelist
Theippan Maung Wa (1899–1942), a pioneer of Burmese literary movement
 Auberon Waugh (1939–2001), author and journalist
 Stanley Weyman (1855–1928), novelist
Theodore Zeldin (1933–), writer

Performing Arts

 Riz Ahmed (1982–), actor and rapper
 Sir Thomas Armstrong (1898–1994), musician
 Kenneth Barnes (1878–1957), Director of R.A.D.A.
 Sir Adrian Boult (1889–1983), conductor
 Laurence Cummings, conductor, organist, harpsichordist
 John Dowland (1563–1626), lutenist and composer
 Giles Farnaby (c. 1563–1640), composer and virginalist
 Michael Flanders (1922–1975), actor, writer and broadcaster
 Howard Goodall (1958–), composer and broadcaster
 Colin Gordon (1911–1972), actor
 Harry Lloyd (1983–), actor
 Norman Painting (1924–2009), radio actor (The Archers)
 Hugh Quarshie (1954–), actor
 Douglas Reith (1953–), actor
 James Ross, conductor
 Donald Swann (1923–1994), composer, musician and entertainer
 John Taverner (1490–1545), composer
 Sir William Walton (1902–1983), composer
 Peter Warlock (1894–1930), composer and critic

Journalists and Broadcasters

 Adam Boulton (1959–), Editor-at-large, Sky News
 David Dimbleby (1938–), broadcaster
 Mehdi Hasan, journalist
 Anthony Howard (1934–2010), journalist and broadcaster
 Marina Hyde, journalist at The Guardian
 Dominic Lawson (1956–), Journalist and son of Nigel Lawson
 Sir Ludovic Kennedy (1919–2009), broadcaster and writer
 S. P. B. Mais (1885–1975), author, journalist and broadcaster
 Hugh Pym (1959-) Health Editor, BBC News
 Richard Stengel (1955–), Managing Editor of Time Magazine
 Sonya Walger (1974–), actress

Business
 Alex Beard (1967–), businessman, Glencore
 Kate Bingham (1965-), venture capitalist
 Russ Dallen, Publisher; investment bank head
 Sir William Goodenough (1899–1951), Chairman of Barclays Bank
 Sir Peter Green (1924–1996), Chairman of Lloyds Bank
 Paul Hamlyn (1926–2001), Publisher (Octopus Publishing Group) and philanthropist.
 Christopher Jones (1976-), venture investor, UVM Health Network Ventures
 Oswald Lewis (1887–1966), Partner in John Lewis & Company
 Sir Henry Meux (1817–1883), Head of brewery Meux and Co
 Sir Charles Mills (1792–1872), Director of the East India Company
 Charles Mills (1830–1898), Partner at Glyn, Mills & Co and MP
 Sir Nigel Mobbs (1937–2005), Chairman of Slough Estates and director of Barclays Bank
 Russi Mody (1918–2014), Chairman and managing director, Tata Steel (formerly TISCO), India
 Peter Moores (1932–2016), Founder of Littlewoods
 Michael Moritz (1954–), venture capitalist, Sequoia Capital
 Crispin Odey (1959–)  hedge fund manager
 David Ogilvy (1929–1999) Iconic advertisement guru; known as the 'Pope of Advertising', he founded Ogilvy & Mather
 Nicky Oppenheimer (1945–) South African at De Beers
 Jonathan Oppenheimer (1969–) South African at De Beers
 Weetman Pearson (1910–1995), Chairman and President of S. Pearson & Son
 Oliver Poole (1911–1993), Chairman of Lazzard, Director of S Pearson & Sons, and MP for Oswestry
 James A. Reed (1963–), Chairman of the Reed group of companies
 Jacob Rothschild (1936–), investment banker
 Sir (Henry) Saxon Tate (1931–2012), MD of Tate & Lyle
 Henry Thynne, 6th Marquess of Bath (1905–1992), Developer of Longleat Safari Park and MP for Frome
 Fredric Warburg (1898–1981), publisher
 Stuart Wheeler (1935–) businessman at IG Index
 Cameron and Tyler Winklevoss (1981–), twins associated with the founding of Facebook

Other people
 Ambrose St. John (1815–1875), close companion of John Henry Newman
 Fra' Andrew Bertie (1929–2008), Prince and Grand Master of the Order of Malta
 Anthony Ashley-Cooper, 10th Earl of Shaftesbury(1938–2004)
 Charles Portal, 1st Viscount Portal of Hungerford (1893–1971) Marshal of the Royal Air Force and Chief of the Air Staff, Second World War
 Charles Boyle, 4th Earl of Orrery (1674–1731), Statesman and patron of the sciences.
 Christopher Codrington (1668–1710), plantation and slave owner, endowed Codrington College and Codrington Library
 Gottfried von Bismarck (1962–2007)
 General Thomas Graham, 1st Baron Lynedoch (1748–1843), commander in the Peninsular War
 James Thomas Brudenell, 7th Earl of Cardigan (1797–1868), Soldier and Commander of the Light Brigade at Balaclava
 John Chapman (1865–1933), abbot of Downside Abbey and founder of Worth School.
 Richard Fitzgeorge de Stacpoole, 1st Duc de Stacpoole (1787–1848)
 John Boyd (1718–1800), art collector and sugar merchant
 Jonathan Hancock (1972–), Memory champion
 Kurt Hahn (1886–1974), Founder of Outward Bound and the Duke of Edinburgh Award
 John Steel "Jock" Lewes (1913-1941), President of the Oxford University Boat Club (1936-37) and "co-founder" of the Special Air Service.
 Laurence Shirley, 4th Earl Ferrers (1720–1760), last member of the House of Lords hanged in England
 Timothy Potts Director of the Fitzwilliam Museum
 Redmond Watt (1950–) Commander-in-Chief, Land Command, British Army
 Richard Scott, 10th Duke of Buccleuch (1954–), Scotland's largest private landowner
 Richard Busby (1606–1695), Headmaster of Westminster School
 Henry Liddell (1811–1898) dean of Christ Church, Vice-Chancellor of Oxford University, and headmaster of Westminster School.
 Sir Peter Osborne, 17th Baronet (1943–), Father of George Osborne
 William Penn (1644–1718), founder of Pennsylvania
 Hubert Chesshyre, retired British officer of arms found to have committed child sexual abuse
 N. Handley

References

 
Christ Church
People associated with Christ Church, Oxford